Chacao is a Caracas Metro station on Line 1. It was opened on 23 April 1988 as part of the extension of Line 1 from Chacaíto to Los Dos Caminos. The station is between Chacaíto and Altamira.

The station is located in Chacao Municipality, hence the name.

References

Caracas Metro stations
1988 establishments in Venezuela
Railway stations opened in 1988